The Armaments Bureau is the affiliated authority of the Ministry of National Defense of the Republic of China.

History
With the National Defense Law and revised Organization Law of the Ministry of National Defense went into effect on 1 March 2002, the Armaments Bureau was formulated according to the two laws. In 2015 Lieutenant General Ho An-ch replaced the retiring Lieutenant General Chin Shou-feng as director of the Armaments Bureau.

In 2020 the Armaments Bureau, along with a number of public and private partners, began developing a powered exoskeleton for military and disaster relief tasks. The program was started because foreign military exoskeleton programs had not yet reached the export stage and as such Taiwan’s requests to procure military exoskeletons had been rebuffed. The program was allocated NT$250 million (US$8.3 million) for the 2020 fiscal year with serial production scheduled to begin in 2023.

Organizational structure
 Program Evaluation Division
 Technology and Industry Division
 Acquisition Management Division
 Procurement Management Division
 Construction and Real Estate Division
 Management Information Office
 General Administration Office
 Comptroller Office

Arsenals

Headquarters
The bureau headquarters is accessible within walking distance South West from Dazhi Station of the Taipei Metro.

209th Arsenal
Responsible for development of CM-32 Armoured Vehicle. Located in the Nantou County town of Jiji.

205th Arsenal
Developers and producers of the T75 pistol, T93 sniper rifle, T91 assault rifle and XT-97 Assault Rifle. Also involved in quadcopter development and production. Based in Kaohsiung.

The 205th Arsenal sells firearms components and ammunition on the American commercial market.

203rd Arsenal
Has developed advanced camouflage materials for special forces use.

202nd Arsenal
The 202nd Arsenal both designs and produces large and small artillery. They also manufacture munitions for artillery systems.

See also
 Ministry of National Defense (Republic of China)
 National Chung-Shan Institute of Science and Technology
 Defense industry of Taiwan

References

2002 establishments in Taiwan
Military installations established in 2002
Military installations of the Republic of China